Kabikabi may be,

Kabikabi people, Australia
Kabikabi language, Australia
Phyllurus kabikabi, sp. gecko